Verticordia pennigera, commonly known as native tea, is a flowering plant in the myrtle family, Myrtaceae, and is endemic to the south-west of Western Australia. It is usually a small erect or prostrate shrub with small leaves and lightly-scented spikes of pale pink to magenta-coloured flowers in spring.

Description

Flowering time is from September to December.

Taxonomy and naming
Verticordia pennigera was first formally described in 1837 by Stephan Endlicher from a specimen collected near the Swan River by Charles von Hügel. The description was published in Enumeratio plantarum quas in Novae Hollandiae ora austro-occidentali ad fluvium Cygnorum et in sinu Regis Georgii collegit Carolus Liber Baro de Hügel. In his review of the genus Verticordia in 1991, Alex George selected a lectotype from the collections of James Drummond. The specific epithet (pennigera) is derived from a Latin word meaning "feather-bearer".

George placed this species in subgenus Eperephes, section Verticordella along with V. halophila, V. blepharophylla, V. lindleyi, V. carinata, V. attenuata, V. drummondii, V. wonganensis, V. paludosa, V. luteola, V. bifimbriata, V. tumida, V. mitodes, V. centipeda, V. auriculata, V. pholidophylla, V. spicata and V. hughanii.

Distribution and habitat
This verticordia usually grows in soils that are sandy or clay types and which are frequently gravelly or granitic. It occurs in a broad area from Kalbarri National Park to the Bremer River area in the Avon Wheatbelt, Carnarvon, Esperance Plains, Geraldton Sandplains, Jarrah Forest, Mallee and Swan Coastal Plain biogeographic regions.

Conservation
Verticordia halophila is classified as "not threatened" by the Western Australian Government Department of Parks and Wildlife.

Use in horticulture
There is a wide variety of forms of native tea in cultivation, from open shrubs with rigid stems to prostrate, bushy forms. There is also some variation in the size and colour of the flowers. Propagation is usually from cuttings. Some forms adapt well to winter rainfall areas but all do best when grown in a sunny position in well-drained soil.

References

pennigera
Endemic flora of Western Australia
Myrtales of Australia
Rosids of Western Australia
Plants described in 1837
Taxa named by Stephan Endlicher